Bling Bling is the third mini-album by South Korean girl group Dal Shabet, released August 11, 2011. "Bling Bling" was used as the lead single, and the official music video was released on August 10. Promotions for "Bling Bling" began on August 12, on Y-Star Live Power Music.

Track listing

Charts and certifications

Sales and certifications

References

2011 EPs
Dance-pop EPs
Korean-language EPs
Dal Shabet albums
Kakao M EPs